Charles Walter Henri James, 6th Baron Northbourne, 7th Baronet, DL (born 14 June 1960), is a British landowner and aristocrat. He succeeded to his father’s titles in 2019. Lord Northbourne is a Knight of Malta.

Lord Northbourne was born on the 14 June 1960. He is the eldest son of Christopher James, 5th Baron Northbourne, and Marie-Sygne Claudel, who is the daughter of Henri Charles Claudel and granddaughter of Paul Claudel. Lord Northbourne is the grandson of Walter James, 4th Baron Northbourne, and Katharine Louise Nickerson of Boston, Massachusetts.

He was educated at Eton College in Berkshire and Magdalen College, Oxford.

Lord Northbourne’s garden at Elizabethan Northbourne Court near Deal in Kent, set within the standing former outbuildings (the manor house burned in the 18th century) and upon ancient terracing, nurtured for a century, is reputed one of the finest in England; it is not generally open to the public.

On 3 October 1987 Lord Northbourne married Catherine Lucy Burrows. They have three children, two sons and a daughter:
 Hon. Henry Christopher William James (born 3 December 1988), the heir apparent
 Hon. Anastasia Aliki James (born 18 February 1992)
 Hon. Alexander Oliver Charles James (born 27 February 1996)

References

1960 births
Living people
People educated at Eton College
Alumni of Magdalen College, Oxford
Deputy Lieutenants of Kent
Charles